Zhelyu Stefanov (born 29 January 1955) is a Bulgarian boxer. He competed in the men's light middleweight event at the 1980 Summer Olympics. At the 1980 Summer Olympics, he defeated Mohamed Halibi of Lebanon, before losing to Ján Franek of Czechoslovakia.

References

1955 births
Living people
Bulgarian male boxers
Olympic boxers of Bulgaria
Boxers at the 1980 Summer Olympics
Place of birth missing (living people)
Light-middleweight boxers